Gav Shakhi (also Romanized as Gāv Shākhī; also known as Gāv Shāhī) is a village in Bakesh-e Yek Rural District, in the Central District of Mamasani County, Fars Province, Iran. At the 2006 census, its population was 126, in 29 families.

References 

Populated places in Mamasani County